Odhav is an area located in Ahmedabad, Gujarat, India.
Odhav is suburb of Ahmadabad and has some residential and also commercial establishments as well.

History 
In February 2020, a fire at a garment factory led to the deaths of three.

Demographics 
As of the 2011 Census, Odhav has a population of 555. The literacy rate in Odhav village was lower than the state average, with 74.85% literacy compared to 78.03 % among Gujarat residents as a whole.

References

Neighbourhoods in Ahmedabad

Gujarat